The name Feria has been assigned by the Philippine Atmospheric, Geophysical and Astronomical Services Administration (PAGASA) to two tropical cyclones in the Western Pacific since 2001.

 Tropical Storm Utor (2001) (T0104, 06W, Feria)
 Typhoon Haitang (T0505, 05W, Feria) – struck Taiwan and China.
 Tropical Storm Nangka (2009) (T0904, 04W, Feria)

The name was retired and replaced by Fabian due to the damage caused by the 2009 storm across Northern Luzon.

Tropical Storm Bebinca (2013) (Fabian)
Tropical Storm Roke (2017) (Fabian)

Pacific typhoon set index articles